Harrisburg's role as a hub in the Underground Railroad (UGRR) was pivotal and successful for several reasons, one of which was because of the number of free blacks that could assist runaways and the many routes through the area.

Background
African American people gravitated from farms in and around Dauphin County, Pennsylvania and from Virginia and Maryland. Some were runaways and some were freed by manumission. Starting in 1817, churches and schools were established by blacks, and sometimes with donations from local white people. Harrisburg was an inviting place to settle because there were opportunities for unskilled jobs. It also made it possible for them to be part of an African American community where they would be one of many, could have a social life, and find spouses. It also provided opportunities for education, including a school for black children that was established by Thomas Dorsey. There were 900 free blacks by 1850, and nearly 1800 by 1860.

In 1836, an anti-slavery society was formed. Delegates went to Philadelphia  where the Pennsylvania Anti-Slavery Society was formed in 1837. Frederick Douglass and William Lloyd Garrison were invited to Harrisburg to speak in front of the courthouse.

The American Colonization Society auxiliary was formed, with the goal of having African Americans emigrate to Africa. Beginning in 1820, some of the city's residents sought to control blacks by having a citizen's patrol, requiring all blacks to register with the city, and harassing people of color in the press and by gangs of white people.

A key hub
It was close to the Mason–Dixon line, that separated the slave states from the free states, and there were many routes through the city. Roads, canals, ferries, and the railroad provided a number of ways that people could move through the area. These routes led north to New York and east to Lancaster and Philadelphia. It was also an important hub because of the number of free blacks that helped runaways.

Aid
Shelter was found in homes of free African Americans, like the house of a schoolteacher Joseph Bustill and a merchant and physician, William Jones. Tanner's Alley, at Walnut and Commonwealth streets, was a center of Underground Railroad activity. The Wesley Union African Methodist Episcopal Zion Church was a station on the UGRR.

Danger
Involvement with the Underground Railroad was inherently dangerous, but even more so for Harrisburg because it was near the border between the slave and free states increased the risk, such as from slave catchers.

The Fugitive Slave Act of 1850 made it more dangerous to assist runaways and it made it much more dangerous for enslaved and free people. Slave catchers could enter free states and expect assistance from law enforcement, regardless of how long and how settled they were in a free state. It also meant that conditions existed so that free people could be enslaved. People who would kidnap blacks knew that it was very hard for a free person to prove that they were free. Such situations were frequently reported by newspapers after 1850, such as the Francis Johnson v. John W. Deshazer court case of Francis Jackson, a free man from New Castle, Pennsylvania who was taken across state lines and sold into slavery. A study by Gerald G. Eggert shows that from the Fugitive Slave Law's 1850 enactment to mid-1853, officials in Harrisburg "vigorously" executed the law; but by that point, citizens voted out three of the four elected constables for serving as slave-runners. This subsequently led the federal commissioner to resign following the community pressure.

Anti-slavery community
Some of Harrisburg's residents were abolitionists and it was the site of a Pennsylvania antislavery convention in 1837. Later, a considerable array of lawyers represented alleged fugitive slaves pro bono, or with funding from resident abolitionists and black community leaders following the Fugitive Slave Act of 1850.

People
 Joseph Cassey Bustill
 Harriet McClintock Marshall and her husband Elisha Marshall.
 J. Howard Wert
 Judy Richards, a black community leader whose black neighborhood between Third & Mulberry Streets was known as "Judytown" due to its center for UGRR activity.

References

History of Harrisburg, Pennsylvania
Populated places on the Underground Railroad
Underground Railroad in Pennsylvania